José A. "Chely" Rodríguez Cruz is a Puerto Rican politician and the current mayor of Hatillo. Rodríguez is affiliated with the Popular Democratic Party (PPD) and has served as mayor since 2005.

References

Living people
Mayors of places in Puerto Rico
Popular Democratic Party (Puerto Rico) politicians
People from Hatillo, Puerto Rico
Year of birth missing (living people)